Dan Beersheva is an Israeli bus company, which provides the local bus routes in Beersheva. The company is a subsidiary of Dan BaDarom.

In 2015, Dan BaDarom, which is a subsidiary of Dan Bus Company, won the tender of the intracity lines in Beersheva.
In 2016, Dan BaDarom decided to establish a subsidiary to operate the bus routes that included in the tender.

In November 25, 2016, Dan BaDarom started to operate the bus routes in Beersheva instead of Metrodan Beersheba that was shut down.

Bus companies of Israel
Companies based in Beersheba
Transport in Beersheba